Jazernica is a village and municipality in Turčianske Teplice District in the Žilina Region of northern central Slovakia.

History
The village was first mentioned in historical records from 1361.

Geography
The municipality lies at an altitude of 448 metres and covers an area of 2.921 km2.

Genealogical resources

The records for genealogical research are available at the state archive "Statny Archiv in Bytca, Slovakia"

 Roman Catholic church records (births/marriages/deaths): 1690-1950 (parish B)
 Lutheran church records (births/marriages/deaths): 1715-1895 (parish B)

See also
 List of municipalities and towns in Slovakia

References

External links
https://web.archive.org/web/20070513023228/http://www.statistics.sk/mosmis/eng/run.html
Surnames of living people in Jazernica

Villages and municipalities in Turčianske Teplice District